Engrailed may refer to:
engrailed (gene), a developmental gene in many animals
Engrailed (moth), Ectropis crepuscularia, a moth
Engrailed (heraldry), a term indicating curves pointing outwards in heraldry
Engrailed arch, in architecture, an arch with cusps, as in a trefoil arch